Harry Thürk (8 March 1927 – 24 November 2005) was a German writer.

Life 
In 1934, Thürk moved with his family to Neustadt. After attending trade school, he began to work for the German train system (Reichsbahn). After being drafted in 1944 and participating in World War II, he returned to Neustadt, which was renamed to Prudnik at the end of the war. However, he was forced to flee from Poland to Weimar. From 1946 to 1948 he worked with the Free German Youth organization in East Germany. After taking a variety of jobs, he became a journalist for a number of different newspapers and had the opportunity to work as a reporter in Southeast Asia during the Vietnam War and also in Korea. He claimed to have been affected by Agent Orange with lifelong effects.

He was married in 1953. Between 1956 and 1958, he worked with the Chinese magazine China Pictorial. After additional travels in East Asia between 1964 and 1980 (including Laos, Cambodia, Vietnam, Korea, China), he returned to Weimar. There between 1971 and 1983 he was the chairman of the writers union in Thuringia.

In 1995 he resigned from the German PEN organization.

Work

With his 2004 book Treffpunkt Wahrheit Thürk had published sixty books altogether, including novels, nonfiction, and children's books, as well as screenplays. His topics and exciting prose made him especially popular in East Germany, and he had altogether nine million copies printed in nine different languages. However, he remained relatively unknown in West Germany.

Among his best-known works are the anti-war novel Die Stunde der toten Augen and the novels Amok and Der Gaukler. Many of his novels take place in Southeast Asia or in his first home of Upper Silesia. In his later years, his writings dealt with current political themes in reunified Germany.

Thürk was a very controversial author because of his political themes as well as the frequent sex scenes in his novels. In the Der Gaukler, he portrayed Aleksandr Solzhenitsyn as a tool of the CIA. However, Thürk, a member of the Socialist Unity Party also prompted controversy within the Communist sphere, for example with his depictions of battle scenes involving German troops against the Red Army in his novel Die Stunde der toten Augen (1957).

Awards and honors

1964 National Prize of East Germany
1971 Theodor-Körner-Preis (DDR)
1977 National Prize of East Germany

Selected works

Stories

Nacht und Morgen, 1950
Treffpunkt Große Freiheit, 1954
Goldener Traum Jugend, 1996
Auch überm Jangtse ist Himmel, 2001

Novels

Die Herren des Salzes, 1956
Die Stunde der toten Augen, 1957
Der Narr und das schwarzhaarige Mädchen, 1958
Das Tal der sieben Monde, 1960
Der Wind stirbt vor dem Dschungel, 1961
Verdorrter Jasmin, 1961
Lotos auf brennenden Teichen, 1962
Die weißen Feuer von Hongkong, 1964
Der Tod und der Regen, 1967
Der Tiger von Shangri-La, 1970
Amok, 1974, situated into Indonesia during the 1965-66 massacres.
Des Drachens grauer Atem, 1976
Der Gaukler (2 Bde.), 	1978
Der schwarze Monsun, 1986
Operation Mekong, 1988 	
Die Lagune, 1991 	
Summer of Dead Dreams, 1993
Piratenspiele, 1995

Crime novels

Der maskierte Buddha, 1991
Die toten Masseusen von Kowloon, 1992
Tod auf Tahiti, 1993
Die tätowierte Unschuld, 1994 
Tuan Subutu läßt schießen, 1995 
Das letzte Aloha, 1996
Schwarze Blüte – sanfter Tod, 1997
Hongkongs Leichen sind sehr tot, 1998
Der Tod kam aus Shanghai, 1999
Mord mit zarter Hand, 2000

Children's books

Fahrten und Abenteuer von Pitt und Ursula, 1955/56
Su-su von der Himmelsbrücke, 1960

External links
 Harry-Thürk-Forum

1927 births
2005 deaths
German military personnel of World War II
People from Prudnik County
People from the Province of Upper Silesia
German male writers
East German writers